Liu Chen-wu (Chinese: 劉震武) is a retired general of the Republic of China (Taiwan). He served as the Commander of the ROC Air Force since 16 January 2013 until he was succeeded by General Shen Yi-ming. He was then appointed as the Deputy Minister of National Defense for Armaments for nine months on duty until General Cheng Te-mei succeeded him. He retired from the Republic of China Air Force on 1 November 2015.

Footnotes

1951 births
Living people
Air force generals
Republic of China Air Force personnel